Jorge Lolas (also known as Jorge Lolas Talhami) is a Chilean doctor who received his MD from the University of Chile. He graduated as a medical surgeon in 1964.

Biography 
He trained in Obstetrics and Gynecology at José Joaquín Aguirre Hospital and obtained his certification after 3 years from the same university. He specialized for two years in colposcopy and cytopathology, and dedicated a large part of those first years to the early detection of cervical cancer while working at the Military Hospital in Santiago, Chile (1974-1978), where he became Head of the Cervical Pathology Department for the early diagnosis of cancer.

During those years he focused his attention on the frequent correlation he had noticed between cervical inflammation and premenstrual syndrome, conditions to which he has since dedicated his life and passion. The so-called Premenstrual Syndrome (PMS) and Premenstrual Dysphoric Disorder (PMDD) form the large part of his experience, which has permitted him to develop an innovative approach to the treatment of this disease and from which he is a well known personality. His new ideas about the mechanism involved in the biology of the menstrual cycle and many ailments related to cervical dysfunction, have made him a controversial character. He coined the term "cyclical hysterotoxemia" to replace the descriptive terms mentioned above (from the Greek “hysterus”, meaning uterus, and “toxemia”, for the presence of toxins in the blood. Ciclical refers to the menstrual cycle) 
For his work he has been a frequent guest on TV, interviews and specialized magazines.
His innovative approach refers to techniques he has perfected over the years to deal with the chronic inflammation of the uterus, mostly affecting the cervix, with which he has obtained impressive results in controlling and eradicating the symptoms of this condition, thus preventing the need for major surgery.

Lolas is a founding member of the Chilean Society of Colposcopy and Pathology of the Lower Genital Tract, he is also a member of the Scientific Society of Chile and runs a gynecological research institute in Santiago, Chile.

He has been nominated for the "National Prize of Applied Sciences" from his patients in 1998 and by the Scientific Society of Chile in 2000, 2002 and 2004, in recognition of his innovative contributions to women's health.

He published his book “Síndrome premenstrual desde una nueva perspectiva” (Premenstrual Syndrome: A New Perspective) in 1995.

Publications 
 Medical Journal of Chile
 Chilean Journal of Clinical Psychiatry
 Chilean Journal of Neuropsychiatry
 Chilean Journal of Dermatology
 Magazine Zona Científica
 Stories in International news agencies Reuters, ANSA and Notimex
 Reports in the Chilean press
 La Tercera
 El Mercurio
 La Nación
 La Segunda
 Las Ultimas Noticias
 Ercilla Magazine
 Qué Pasa Magazine
 Woman to Woman Magazine
 Cosas Magazine
 Caras Magazine

Presentations 
 Chilean Society of Colposcopy and Pathology of the Lower Genital Tract
 Meeting at Las Condes Clinic

Television 
 Informe Especial  (Special Report)
 Noticiario 24 hrs de TVN (24-hour News on TVN)
 CNN en Español
 Program “Cuéntame” de TVN
 Program “Almorzando en el Canal 13”
 CBS Telenoticias
 Program “Buenas tardes Eli” on Megavisión channel.

Conferences 
 First Chilean Congress of Colposcopy and Pathology of the Lower Genital Tract, 2000
 10th World Congress of Cervical Pathology and Colposcopy, 1999
 17th World Congress of Gynecology and Obstetrics, 2003
 15th World Congress of Cytopathology, 2004
 Gia Allemand Foundation PMDD Annual Conference, 2016

References

External links
 Síndrome Premenstrual desde una Nueva Perspectiva

Living people
Chilean obstetricians and gynaecologists
People from Santiago
Year of birth missing (living people)